Buddy the Detective is a 1934 Warner Bros. Looney Tunes cartoon, directed by Jack King. The short was released on October 17, 1934, and stars Buddy, the second star of the series.

Summary
The film opens to an old house on a barren hill; within sits the Mad Musician at his piano, playing Rachmaninoff's Prelude in C-sharp minor, Op. 3, No. 2. A tree branch climbs through the window, and, at the Musician's magical behest, plays the keys. But the branch's playing of "Shake your Powder Puff" visibly disappoints the Musician, who then plays some more, disappoints himself, and cries out for inspiration, laughing madly: he walks over to a table, taps the bottom of a bottle, and out pops a frog, which the Musician bewitches, as the branch before, into playing. But the frog disappoints his master with a rendition of "Amaryllis", and so happily leaps off of the keys and away into a picture of a pond. The Musician makes a portrait of a man in uniform to play a violin, which the painted figure breaks, to the Mad Musician's further aggravation. The cackling madman stalks about in contemplation.

We come then to a newspaper headline: "Extra! Mad Musician Escapes!" And who should be reading the paper but Cookie? We come back to the Musician, who opens a telephone directory and chooses, at random, a name: who but Cookie at 00 1/2 Cornbread Avenue? The musician calls Cookie, and, over the phone, magically entices her (a tough customer, he admits!) to come to him: Cookie stalks out the door, but Bozo the Dog remains. Bozo sniffs about for a trail and then rushes off to find Buddy. Our Hero sits at home, in a chair, admiring a picture of Cookie. Bozo knocks over Buddy's chair, breaks the frame of the photograph and yelps wildly at Buddy. Buddy at first, can not decipher what Cookie's pet wants him to know, until Bozo picks up the picture of Cookie. Buddy then dons an outfit resembling that of Sherlock Holmes and rushes out the door with Bozo.

Meanwhile, the Musician commands Cookie to play, at the piano, the same prelude that he attempted before, to flawed success: Cookie devolves, to her master's consternation, into a rendition of the jazzy "Hey, Sailor!" Buddy the sleuth finds the house, and burns a rectangular hole in the locked door by shining a flashlight through his magnifying glass. The audience gets to see that this is a haunted house; a gremlin creeps into Buddy's flashlight and spooks Bozo. Skeletons creep about, getting themselves water, which passes directly through them, from a water cooler, and opening umbrellas that are, as they, mere skeletons. The dog chases a skeleton into a wall, where it breaks apart.

A curtain flies off of an open window as a result of the gust outside and Bozo slips on it into the next room, taking Buddy with him. The dog rushes through a threshold, but Buddy is knocked upwards onto a balcony, from which he can clearly see Cookie when she briefly emerges from a doorway to scream for help. Buddy finds his way over the balcony and knocks on the very door, but the Musician peeks out of a little hole in the top and taunts Our Hero. The door is locked, so Buddy simply picks up a nearby door and drops it next to the one through which he wishes to enter the room. Easily attaining access in this clever fashion, Buddy spies the Musician still standing at the door, unaware of his enemy's entrance.

Buddy kicks the Mad Musician in the back side, and a fight ensues! Buddy kicks the villain through the door, which spins about as if on an axis, and flips the Musician back into the room. The Musician finds Buddy, but Buddy quickly grabs his opponent's hair and spins him around, freeing him only to knocks him into a wall. Buddy puts a small playing stool on the stunned villain's back and spins the top part. The stool's midsection extends from the Musician's back to the ceiling, thus trapping him on the floor. Cookie, saved, thanks her sweetheart, and begins to play the Rachmaninoff piece, but swiftly changes to the same jazzy piece that she played before and that the villain clearly cannot stand!

The Musician's phone book
In addition to Cookie's name, the names of three Schlesinger employees appear in the Musician's phone directory: R. Clampett, Ben Clopton, and Manny Corral, a cameraman.

Cookie
As is characteristic only of those Buddy cartoons directed by Jack King (though not all of them), Cookie has braided blond hair.

Dating discrepancy
In keeping with the article Looney Tunes and Merrie Melodies filmography (1929–39), the date here given for the release of this cartoon is September 15; this conflicts with the information given in the appendix of Leonard Maltin's Of Mice and Magic (see references below.) For more on this discrepancy and others, see the Release date discrepancy section of the article Buddy's Circus.

References

External links
 
 

1934 films
1934 animated films
American black-and-white films
Films scored by Bernard B. Brown
Films scored by Norman Spencer (composer)
Animated films about music and musicians
Films directed by Jack King
Buddy (Looney Tunes) films
American haunted house films
Looney Tunes shorts
Warner Bros. Cartoons animated short films
1930s Warner Bros. animated short films
American detective films